Matt Bell may refer to:

 Matt Bell (author) (born 1980), American writer
 Matt Bell (racing driver) (born 1985), American race car driver
 Matt Bell (television presenter) (born 1980), British television presenter, writer and comedian
 Matt Bell (footballer) (1897–1962), English footballer
 Matt Bell, acting mayor of Manawatu District

See also
 Matthew Bell (disambiguation)